Jacqueline Belenyesiová (born 3 December 1985) is a Slovak former competitive figure skater. She is a three-time (2005–2006, 2008) Slovak national champion and competed at five ISU Championships, qualifying to the free skate at the 2006 European Championships in Lyon.

Competitive highlights
JGP: ISU Junior Grand Prix

References

External links
 
 Jacqueline Belenyesiová at Tracings.net

Slovak female single skaters
1985 births
Living people
Sportspeople from Košice
Figure skaters at the 2007 Winter Universiade